Betas is an American streaming television series that was produced by Amazon Studios. The show starred Joe Dinicol and Karan Soni as "dating app" developers in Silicon Valley who are looking for an investor.

Amazon offered the first three episodes of Betas for free on November 22, 2013, with each subsequent episode released weekly thereafter. In March 2014, Amazon declined to renew for a second season.

Cast

Series regulars 
 Joe Dinicol – Trey
 Karan Soni – Nash
 Jon Daly – Hobbes
 Charlie Saxton – Mitchell
 Maya Erskine – Mikki
 Daivik Dave - Daivik

Recurring characters 
 Ed Begley, Jr. - Murch
 Madeline Zima - Jordan Alexis
 Tyson Ritter - Dane
Breeda Wool - Victoria
 Mark L. Young - Trevor
 Margo Harshman - Lisa
 Diana Burbano - Hispanic Mother
Paul Walter Hauser - Dashawn

Episodes

Reception
Metacritic gave season 1 an average rating of 69/100 based on reviews from 8 critics. Rotten Tomatoes gave the show a score of 85% based on reviews from 13 critics.

References

External links
 Betas on Amazon

2010s American comedy television series
2013 American television series debuts
2014 American television series endings
Amazon Prime Video original programming
English-language television shows
Culture of Silicon Valley
Television series about computing
Television series by Amazon Studios